Santa Rosa de Lima is a municipality located in the Brazilian state of Sergipe. Its population was 3,923 in 2020, and its area is 68 km².

References

Municipalities in Sergipe